Afrineh (also Romanized as Afrīneh, and Afrīnah; also known as Afrīneh-ye Bālā and Afrīneh-ye ‘Olyā) is a village in Afrineh Rural District, Mamulan District, Pol-e Dokhtar County, Lorestan Province, Iran. At the 2006 census, its population was 2,185, in 460 families.

References 

Towns and villages in Pol-e Dokhtar County